Lugal-kisalsi, also Lugaltarsi (lugal-kisal-si, also , lugal-tar-si, lugal-sila-si) was a King of Uruk and Ur who lived towards the end of the 25th century BCE, succeeding his father Lugal-kinishe-dudu, according to contemporary inscriptions, although he does not appear in the Sumerian King List (but his father does in some versions). In one of his inscriptions, he appears as "Lugalkisalsi, the first-born son of Lugalkigenedudu, king of Uruk and Ur".

He had a son named Lubarasi, and a grandson named Silim-Utu. Numerous inscriptions in his name are known.

Inscriptions
Lugal-kisalsi is known from several inscriptions. Lugal-kisalsi was also called "King of Kish" in some of his inscriptions:

Statuary
Lugal-kisalsi is known for a foundation peg with effigy and inscription, and several similar statuettes, although without inscriptions. The foundation peg reads:

A statue in the Louvre Museum is in the name of the grandson of Lugal-kisalsi, bearing the inscription: "Satam, son of Lu-Bara, son of Lugal-kisal-si, king of Uruk, attendant of Girim-sim, prince of Uruk."

See also

History of Sumer
Sumerian king list

References

|-

25th-century BC Sumerian kings
Kings of Kish
Kings of Ur
Kings of Uruk
Sumerian kings